Leo J. Hindery, Jr. (born October 31, 1947) is an American businessman, author, political activist and philanthropist.

Hindery is Managing Partner of InterMedia Partners, a New York-based media industry private equity fund, and, since March 2019, Chairman and Chief Executive Officer of Trine Acquisition Corp, a newly created media industry SPAC. Until 2004, he was chairman and chief executive officer of The YES Network, the nation’s largest regional sports network which he founded in 2001 as the television home of the New York Yankees.

He headed Tele-Communications, Inc. (TCI) before it was merged into AT&T Corporation in 1999, when he became CEO of AT&T Broadband. Later, he was CEO of GlobalCenter, a data center company first purchased by Global Crossing and later sold to Exodus Communications.

He is a member of the Council on Foreign Relations, and from 2003 through December 2007 was Senate-appointed Vice Chair of the HELP Commission formed by an Act of Congress to improve U.S. foreign assistance.  He is a member of the Hall of Fame of the Minority Media & Telecommunications Council,  co-chair of the Task Force on Jobs Creation and was the founder of Jobs First 2012. He is a Director of Hemisphere Media Group, Inc.

Hindery has written two books: It Takes a CEO: It’s Time to Lead with Integrity  and The Biggest Game of All.

Hindery now lives in Cornelius, North Carolina. He has an MBA from the Stanford Graduate School of Business, and a BA from Seattle University.

Hindery is a member of the Cable Industry Hall of Fame, was formerly Chairman of the National Cable Television Association and of C-SPAN, and has been recognized as one of the cable industry's "25 Most Influential Executives Over the Past 25 Years"  and one of the "30 Individuals with the Most Significant Impact on Cable's Early History."

Politics
 In 2004, his name was floated as a possible successor to Terry McAuliffe as head of the Democratic National Committee.
 Hindery served as Senior Economic Policy Advisor for presidential candidate John Edwards from December 2006 until February 2008. In 2008 Hindery was an economic and trade advisor to then-Presidential candidate  Barack Obama, and in 2012 served as an economic policy surrogate for President Obama.  On the withdrawal of Bill Richardson as nominee for Secretary of Commerce on January 4, 2009 it was suggested that he might be a suitable replacement.
 Hindery endorsed Democratic candidate Hillary Clinton in the 2016 U.S. presidential election.

Motorsport
Hindery was the chairman of Port Imperial Racing Associates, the organizer of the proposed Grand Prix of America Formula 1 race to be held at the Port Imperial Street Circuit in New Jersey, United States. The race was included in the Formula 1 calendar for 2013, 2014 and 2015 but was ultimately cancelled due to a lack of funding.

He was a keen amateur racing driver, taking part in the 24 Hours of Le Mans 4 times and winning his class in a Porsche 911 GT3-RSR in 2005.

24 Hours of Le Mans results

Books
 It Takes a CEO 
 The Biggest Game of All .

References

External links

American telecommunications industry businesspeople
American male writers
Living people
Private equity and venture capital investors
24 Hours of Le Mans drivers
1947 births
24 Hours of Daytona drivers
American Le Mans Series drivers